This article is a list of diseases of apples (Malus domestica).

Bacterial diseases

Fungal diseases

Nematodes, parasitic

Viral diseases

Viroid diseases

Suspected viral- and viroid-like diseases

Phytoplasmal diseases

Miscellaneous diseases and disorders

References

External links
 Common Names of Diseases, The American Phytopathological Society

Apple